Bugid Y Aiba is a loa of war in Vodou, especially in Haiti and Puerto Rico.

Etymology
Bugid Y Aiba is Arawak in origin, inherited from the Haitian and Puerto Rican Taíno ancestors from their three principal deities: Bugia, Bradama, and Aiba.

References

Haitian Vodou gods
War gods